

Hilda Peak is a  mountain summit located at the northern extreme of Banff National Park, in the Canadian Rockies of Alberta, Canada. The nearest higher peak is Mount Athabasca,  to the southwest. Hilda Peak is situated south of Sunwapta Pass and can be prominently seen from the Icefields Parkway. The Hilda Glacier lies to the south side of the peak, and the Boundary Glacier lies to the west.

History

The first ascent of the mountain was made in 1938 by E. Brooks, H. Brooks, R. Cross, and W. Marples. The mountain was named Hilda Peak in 1938.

The mountain's name was officially adopted in 1985 when approved by the Geographical Names Board of Canada.

Geology

Like other mountains in Banff Park, Hilda Peak is composed of sedimentary rock laid down from the Precambrian to Jurassic periods. Formed in shallow seas, this sedimentary rock was pushed east and over the top of younger rock during the Laramide orogeny.

Climate

Based on the Köppen climate classification, Hilda Peak is located in a subarctic climate with cold, snowy winters, and mild summers. Winter temperatures can drop below -20 °C with wind chill factors below -30 °C. Precipitation runoff from Hilda Peak drains east into Hilda Creek, thence Nigel Creek, tributaries of the North Saskatchewan River.

Gallery

See also
List of mountains of Canada
Geography of Alberta

References

External links

 Hilda Peak weather forecast
 Parks Canada web site: Banff National Park

Three-thousanders of Alberta
Mountains of Banff National Park
Alberta's Rockies
Canadian Rockies